"Rebelde" (English: "Rebel") is a song recorded by the Mexican pop group RBD. It was released as the first single off their debut album Rebelde in 2004. "Rebelde" became 2005's major hit in Mexico and was the song which started the band's successful career. The single is widely considered to be the group's signature song since RBD is short for Rebelde.
The song was used extensively in the soap opera Rebelde during its first season.

Music video
RBD along with some cast members from Rebelde arrive at a house for an exclusive party. Throughout the video, the different cast members and RBD party throughout the house; the group is also seen singing on a stage while performing some choreographed dance moves. They keep rebelling throughout the video even though their parents are around. At the end of the video they are led into the woods by a man to take away their sins.

Versions

Release Dates

Chart performance

The song gave the band recognition, but ultimately peaked at #37 on Billboard's Top 50 Latin Songs, while "Solo Quédate en Silencio," the band's next single, peaked at #2 and stayed there for over a month.

In 2008, "Rebelde" was certificated Gold in Brasil.

Certifications

Awards and nominations

References 
 

2004 debut singles
RBD songs
Spanish-language songs
2004 songs
EMI Records singles
Songs written by DJ Kafka
Songs written by Max di Carlo
Song recordings produced by Armando Ávila